Statistics of Swedish football Division 2 in season 1984.

League standings

Division 2 Norra 1984

Division 2 Södra 1984

Footnotes

References
Sweden - List of final tables (Clas Glenning)

}

Swedish Football Division 2 seasons
2
Sweden
Sweden